Events from the year 1470 in France

Incumbents
 Monarch – Louis XI

Events

Births

30 June – Charles VIII of France (died 1498)

Full date missing
Estienne de La Roche, mathematician (died 1530)
Francis, Count of Vendôme, prince (died 1495)
Guillaume de Marcillat, painter and stained glass artist (died 1529)
Jacques de La Palice, nobleman (died 1525)

Deaths

Full date missing
Richard Olivier de Longueil, bishop (born 1406)
Guigone de Salins (born 1403)

See also

References

1470s in France